The Review of Educational Research is a bimonthly peer-reviewed review journal published by SAGE Publications on behalf of the American Educational Research Association. It was established in 1931 and covers all aspects of education and educational research. The journal's editor-in-chief is P. Karen Murphy (Pennsylvania State University).

Mission Statement 
The Review of Educational Research (RER) publishes critical, integrative reviews of research literature bearing on education. Such reviews should include conceptualizations, interpretations, and syntheses of literature and scholarly work in a field broadly relevant to education and educational research. RER encourages the submission of research relevant to education from any discipline, such as reviews of research in psychology, sociology, history, philosophy, political science, economics, computer science, statistics, anthropology, and biology, provided that the review bears on educational issues. RER does not publish original empirical research unless it is incorporated in a broader integrative review. RER will occasionally publish solicited, but carefully refereed, analytic reviews of special topics, particularly from disciplines infrequently represented.

History 
The Review of Educational Research was established in 1931 as AERA’s second publication with the goal of “serv[ing] as a record of advancements within the field of education, broadly defined”. To this end, RER focused on providing an organized review of research in key areas of education, namely curriculum, learning, teacher preparation, educational administration, higher education, education theory, and policy. The major research for each topic was to be reviewed in themed issues of the journal over the course of a three-year time span, with a change in the editorial board every three years to coincide with the start of each new cycle. In this way, the editors planned to cover the “whole field” of educational topics during their tenure, and submissions were solicited by the editors from specific researchers. During the first three years, reviews were designed to catch readers up, so to speak, on relevant research in each topic, and so provided less in terms of synthesis or analysis, but rather read more like a list of studies. However, after the first three-year cycle, reviews focused mainly on the previous three years since the last review on that topic, and more discussion and evaluation were possible.

In 1970, RER underwent a fundamental change in structure, when the editorial board decided that its goals could at that time “best be achieved by pursuing a policy of publishing unsolicited reviews of research on topics of the contributor’s choosing." This marked a shift, therefore, not only in the organization of the journal, in that issues were no longer themed or limited to prescribed categories of exploration, but also in the submission process, in that authors were free to submit without special request from the editors.

Abstracting and indexing 
The journal is abstracted and indexed in Academic Search Premier, EBSCO databases, Current Contents/Social & Behavioral Sciences, ProQuest Education Journals, PsycINFO, SafetyLit, Scopus, and the Social Sciences Citation Index. According to the Journal Citation Reports, the journal has a 2017 impact factor of 8.241, ranking it first out of 238 journals in the category "Education & Educational Research".

References

External links 
 

Education journals
Quarterly journals
Publications established in 1931
English-language journals
SAGE Publishing academic journals